Namazgah (also Romanized as Namāzgāh and Namāz Gāh) is a village in Samen Rural District, Samen District, Malayer County, Hamadan Province, Iran. At the 2006 census, its population was 584, in 146 families.

References 

Populated places in Malayer County